Barugh may refer to:

Barugh, South Yorkshire
Barugh (Great and Little), parish in North Yorkshire